The 2016 All-Ireland Under 21 Football Championship is an inter county football competition between 31 of the 32 counties of Ireland (Kilkenny did not participate). Provincial championships were held in Connacht, Leinster, Munster and Ulster with the winners progressing to the All-Ireland semi-finals.

The competition was sponsored for the second time by EirGrid.

2016 Connacht Under-21 Football Championship

Quarter-final 
 Roscommon 1-16 Galway 2-10  Kiltoom

Semi-finals 
 Roscommon 1-18 Sligo 0-8 Markievicz Park
 Mayo 4-12 Leitrim 0-15  Carrick-on-Shannon

Final

2016 Leinster Under-21 Football Championship

Preliminary round 
 Wicklow 5-12 Carlow 3-13   IT Carlow
 Laois 3-15 Louth 1-14      Haggardstown
 Wexford 0-14 Longford 2-5    Enniscorthy

Quarter-finals 
 Dublin 1-12 Meath 0-9    Parnell Park
 Kildare 2-14 Offaly 1-6  Hawkfield
 Wexford 0-7 Westmeath 1-5 Enniscorthy
 Laois 0-20 Wicklow 3-9     O'Moore Park

Semi-finals

Final

2016 Munster Under-21 Football Championship

Quarter-finals 
 Cork 0-23 Clare 0-8  Cooraclare
 Kerry 0-11 Tipperary 1-7  Austin Stack Park, Tralee

Semi-finals

Final

2016 Ulster Under-21 Football Championship

Preliminary round 
 Derry 0-16 Antrim 0-11     Celtic Park

Quarter-finals 
 Monaghan 1-15 Fermanagh 0-3    Iniskeen
 Down 0-9 Armagh 5-16           Pairc Esler
 Cavan 0-10 Tyrone 2-10       Breffni Park
 Donegal 0-14 Derry 2-7    Ballybofey

Semi-finals 
 Monaghan 2-16 Armagh 0-9   Pairc Esler
 Tyrone 1-15 Donegal 2-8    Celtic Park

Final

All-Ireland

Semi-finals

Final

External links
Full Fixtures and Results

All-Ireland Under-21 Football Championships
All-Ireland Under 21 Football Championship